Charles Shelley may refer to:

 Charles M. Shelley (1833–1907), Confederate States Army general and U.S. Representative from Alabama
 Sir Charles Shelley, 5th Baronet (1838–1902), British Army officer and landowner
 Charles Lee Shelley (born 1956), American fencer